Brush Creek is a stream in Osage County in central Missouri. It is a tributary of the Gasconade River.

The stream source arises adjacent to Missouri Route U and it flows southeast parallel to that road to cross under Route E just west of Rich Fountain. The stream turns east and follows just south of Route E to its confluence just south of the Missouri Route 89 bridge over the Gasconade.

Brush Creek was so named due to the abundance of brush near its course.

See also
List of rivers of Missouri

References

Rivers of Osage County, Missouri
Rivers of Missouri